The 2nd World Cup season began in January in West Germany and concluded in April in the US Jean-Claude Killy of France repeated as the overall champion, and announced his retirement from World Cup competition.  Nancy Greene of Canada repeated as the women's World Cup overall champion, and announced her retirement from World Cup competition.

For the only time, the results of the Winter Olympics were included in the season standings.  Future Olympic results were not included as World Cup races, nor were World Championship results after 1970.  However, the inclusion of the Olympics was irrelevant to the final outcome, as both Killy and Greene would have won the season titles had the Olympics been excluded.

Calendar

Men 

Note: Race 7, 8 and 9 were the Olympic events at Grenoble, which count also for the World Cup. See also 1968 Winter Olympics and Alpine skiing at the 1968 Winter Olympics.Race 10 and 11 were held on the same day.

Women 

Note: Race 9, 10 and 11 were the Olympic events at Grenoble, which count also for the World Cup. See also 1968 Winter Olympics and Alpine skiing at the 1968 Winter Olympics.

Men

Overall 
see complete table

In Men's Overall World Cup 1967/68 the best three downhills, best three giant slaloms and best three slaloms count. 12 racers had a point deduction.

Downhill 
see complete table

In Men's Downhill World Cup 1967/68 the best 3 results count. Gerhard Nenning won the cup with maximum points.

Giant slalom 
see complete table

In Men's Giant Slalom World Cup 1967/68 the best 3 results count. Jean-Claude Killy won the cup with maximum points.

Slalom 
see complete table

In Men's Slalom World Cup 1967/68 the best 3 results count.

Women

Overall 
see complete table

In Women's Overall World Cup 1967/68 the best three downhills, best three giant slaloms and best three slaloms count. 13 racers had a point deduction.

Downhill 
see complete table

In Women's Giant Slalom World Cup 1967/68 the best 3 results count.

Giant slalom 
see complete table

In Women's Giant Slalom World Cup 1967/68 the best 3 results count. Nancy Greene won the cup with maximum points.

Slalom 
see complete table

In Women's Slalom World Cup 1967/68 the best 3 results count. Marielle Goitschel won the cup with maximum points.

Nations Cup

Overall

Men

Women

Medal table

Notes

External links 
FIS-ski.com – World Cup standings – 1968

 
FIS Alpine Ski World Cup
World Cup